Rob Parker (born January 10, 1964) is an American sports anchor for 7 Action News at 10pm on TV20 Detroit and a former contributor to Fox Sports 1's show Skip and Shannon: Undisputed. Prior to that, he was a sports columnist for ClickOnDetroit.com and a regular commentator on WDIV-TV Local 4 Sports Final Edition. Parker previously served as a sports columnist for The Detroit News and was a member of ESPN'S First Take program. Parker currently co-hosts The Odd Couple on Fox Sports Radio with Chris Broussard.

Career
Parker graduated from Martin Van Buren High School in Queens Village and then received a B.S. in journalism from Southern Connecticut State University and a Master's degree in journalism from Columbia University. He currently serves as an adjunct instructor at the Annenberg School of Journalism at the University of Southern California.

Print
He was the first black sports columnist at the Detroit Free Press in 1993 and the first black general sports columnist at Newsday in New York in 1995. Parker has also written for The Detroit News, Times Leader in Wilkes-Barre, Pennsylvania, the Daily News in New York and The Cincinnati Enquirer.

Radio
Parker currently co-hosts The Odd Couple on Fox Sports Radio with Chris Broussard. He has hosted the sports-talk radio show, Parker and The Man with Mark Wilson for a decade on various stations. Parker also had a show on ESPN Radio in New York. On March 24, 2014, Parker and The Man returned to WDFN. In 2019, Rob Parker and Apple Podcast came together and made a deal which let Parker talk on his own podcast called Inside the Rob Parker.

Business 
Rob Parker co-owns a barbershop called Sporty Cutz on Seven Mile Road in Detroit. It was established in October 2002.

Television
Parker has worked as a contributor to FS1's Skip and Shannon: Undisputed, teaming up again with former debate partner Skip Bayless from ESPN's First Take. He was also a frequent guest on Colin Cowherd's The Herd With Colin Cowherd for television and radio. He has worked at WDIV-TV in Detroit since 1993.  Parker was hired on at ESPN in 2003.  He was a regular on First Take, where he debated controversial sports topics with Bayless and Stephen A. Smith.  He also appeared on ESPN's Numbers Never Lie with Michael Smith.  Parker also hosted a TV show called Sports Rap on WADL in Detroit with Detroit Lions safety Ron Rice.

Controversies

Hank Aaron column
In 2004, Parker penned a much-maligned column where he called Hank Aaron a "coward" for declining to attend when Barry Bonds would break the career home run record.

Michigan State fight
In October 2008, Parker erroneously reported that Kirk Cousins, quarterback for the Michigan State Spartans, was involved in a fight with members of the Michigan State hockey team. After being publicly reproved by head coach Mark Dantonio at his weekly news conference, Parker was suspended by The Detroit News for two weeks.

Rod Marinelli question
On December 21, 2008, at a press conference following the Lions 42–7 loss to the New Orleans Saints, during the Lions' 0–16 season, Parker caused controversy when he addressed a question at Lions head coach Rod Marinelli about Lions defensive coordinator Joe Barry, Marinelli's son-in-law, inquiring whether Marinelli wished that his daughter had "married a better defensive coordinator." The question was criticized as unprofessional and inappropriate. The next day, Parker wrote that the comment was "an attempt at humor" and not a malicious attack. On January 6, 2009, The Detroit News announced that Parker had resigned from the newspaper the previous week.

Comments on Robert Griffin III
On December 13, 2012, on First Take, Parker made controversial remarks relating to Washington Redskins quarterback Robert Griffin III during a segment discussing Griffin's comment at an earlier press conference that although he was an African-American, he did not want to be defined by that alone. Parker stated that these words were a "red flag" for him and asked "Is he a brother, or is he a cornball brother?" When asked to explain what he meant by this, he stated, "He's not real. OK, he's black, he kind of does the thing, but he's not really down with the cause. He's not one of us. He's kind of black but he's not really, like, the guy you want to hang out with because he's off to something else." Parker then cited Griffin having a white fiancée and "talk about how he's a Republican" (though he acknowledged having no information to support this).

Later that day, ESPN spokesman Mike Soltys said that Parker's comments, "were inappropriate and we are evaluating our next steps." ESPN announced on December 20, 2012 that Parker would be suspended for 30 days.  Parker expressed surprise at the reaction to his comments, stating "Looking back on some of the comments, I can see where people could take it out of context and run with it. But the response and what happened over the past 30 days is just shocking." ESPN announced on Tuesday, January 8, 2013, that Parker would not return. By coincidence, Griffin III joined ESPN as a football analyst in the summer of 2021.

References

External links
 Rob Parker bio at ClickOnDetroit
 

American male journalists
Journalists from New York City
American sports radio personalities
Sportspeople from Detroit
Sportspeople from Queens, New York
African-American sports journalists
American sports journalists
1964 births
Living people
Detroit Free Press people
The Detroit News people
Fox Sports 1 people
21st-century African-American people
20th-century African-American people